Yu Yang (born 7 April 1986) is a retired Chinese badminton player specializing in doubles. She is an Olympic Games gold medalist, three time World Champion and four time Asian Champion. Yu was part of the China winning team in four Sudirman Cup, three Uber Cup, two Asian Games, and in a Asia Team Championships.

She graduated with a bachelor's degree from the University of Science and Technology of China.

Career 
A doubles specialist, Yu and her regular partner Du Jing have steadily emerged as one of the world's elite women's doubles teams since 2004. They confirmed this status by winning the gold medal at the 2008 Olympics in Beijing over South Korea's Lee Hyo-jung and Lee Kyung-won. Their other titles have included the Polish Open (2004): the China Masters (2005); the Asian Championships and Swiss Open in 2006; the Russian, Hong Kong, and Indonesia Opens in 2007; and the French, South Korea, and Singapore Opens in 2008. Yu and Du were bronze medalists at the World Championships in 2006, but were unable to play in the tourney's 2007 edition. They were runners-up at the prestigious All-England Championships in 2008, but avenged that loss by beating their All-England conquerors in the Olympic final.

Yu has also enjoyed recent success in mixed doubles with He Hanbin. They captured titles at the Badminton Asia Championships and the Thailand and Denmark Opens in 2007; and the India, Swiss, Malaysia, and French Opens in 2008. They finished in third place at the Beijing Olympics, making Yu one of only two players to win two medals at the competition.

At the 2012 Summer Olympics, Yu Yang and her partner, Wang Xiaoli, along with Jung Kyung-eun and Kim Ha-na, Ha Jung-eun and Kim Min-jung of South Korea, and Meiliana Jauhari and Greysia Polii of Indonesia were disqualified from the competition for "not using one's best efforts to win a match" and "conducting oneself in a manner that is clearly abusive or detrimental to the sport" following matches the previous evening during which they were accused of throwing the match.  Yu Yang and Wang Xiaoli played against South Korea's Jung Kyung-eun and Kim Ha-na, and  it has been suggested both teams wanted to lose in order to secure an easier draw,  although Yu claimed "she and her partner were just trying to conserve their strength for the knockout rounds". Shortly after, Yu Yang announced that she would retire from badminton.

Achievements

Olympic Games 
Women's doubles

Mixed doubles

BWF World Championships 
Women's doubles

Mixed doubles

Asian Games 
Women's doubles

Asian Championships 
Women's doubles

Mixed doubles

World Junior Championships 
Girls' doubles

Mixed doubles

BWF Superseries ( 42 titles, 16 runner-ups ) 
The BWF Superseries, which was launched on 14 December 2006 and implemented in 2007, is a series of elite badminton tournaments, sanctioned by the Badminton World Federation (BWF). BWF Superseries levels are Superseries and Superseries Premier. A season of Superseries consists of twelve tournaments around the world that have been introduced since 2011. Successful players are invited to the Superseries Finals, which are held at the end of each year.

Women's doubles

Mixed doubles

  BWF Superseries Finals tournament
  BWF Superseries Premier tournament
  BWF Superseries tournament

BWF Grand Prix (8 titles, 8 runner-ups) 
The BWF Grand Prix had two levels, the BWF Grand Prix and Grand Prix Gold. It was a series of badminton tournaments sanctioned by the Badminton World Federation (BWF) which was held from 2007 to 2017.

Women's doubles

Mixed doubles

  BWF Grand Prix Gold tournament
  BWF Grand Prix tournament

IBF International 
Women's doubles

Mixed doubles

Record against selected opponents 
Women's doubles results with former partner Du Jing against Super Series finalists, World semi-finalists, and Olympic quarterfinalists:

  Petya Nedelcheva &  Anastasia Russkikh 1–0
  Cheng Shu & Zhao Yunlei 5–0
  Gao Ling & Huang Sui 1–2
  Ma Jin & Wang Xiaoli 4–1
  Pan Pan & Zhang Yawen 1–0
  Tian Qing & Zhang Yawen 1–1
  Wei Yili & Zhang Yawen 6–0
  Wei Yili & Zhao Tingting 0–1
  Yang Wei & Zhang Jiewen 2–6
  Cheng Wen-hsing & Chien Yu-chin 8–0
  Jwala Gutta & Ashwini Ponnappa 1–0
  Mizuki Fujii & Reika Kakiiwa 1–0
  Miyuki Maeda & Satoko Suetsuna 5–0
  Kumiko Ogura & Reiko Shiota 6–0
  Ha Jung-eun & Kim Min-jung 3–0
  Lee Hyo-jung & Lee Kyung-won 6–4
  Chin Eei Hui & Wong Pei Tty 5–1
  Jiang Yanmei & Li Yujia 2–0
  Duanganong Aroonkesorn & Kunchala Voravichitchaikul 4–0

References

External links 
 
 
 

1986 births
Living people
People from Haicheng, Liaoning
Sportspeople from Anshan
Badminton players from Liaoning
Chinese female badminton players
Badminton players at the 2008 Summer Olympics
Badminton players at the 2012 Summer Olympics
Badminton players at the 2016 Summer Olympics
Olympic badminton players of China
Olympic gold medalists for China
Olympic bronze medalists for China
Olympic medalists in badminton
Medalists at the 2008 Summer Olympics
Badminton players at the 2010 Asian Games
Badminton players at the 2014 Asian Games
Asian Games gold medalists for China
Asian Games silver medalists for China
Asian Games medalists in badminton
Medalists at the 2010 Asian Games
Medalists at the 2014 Asian Games
World No. 1 badminton players
BWF Best Female Player of the Year